Vakıflar is a proposed underground station on the Halkapınar—Otogar Line of the İzmir Metro. It will be located beneath Şehitler Avenue near the intersection with Fatih Avenue just south of Atatürk Stadium. Construction of the station, along with the metro line, is scheduled to begin in 2018.

Vakıflar station is expected to open in 2020.

Nearby Places of Interest
İzmir Atatürk Stadium

References

İzmir Metro
Konak District
Proposed rapid transit stations in Turkey